Castelli is a comune in the  province of Teramo, Abruzzo,  Italy, included in the Gran Sasso e Monti della Laga National Park.

The medieval hill town lies beneath  Mount Camicia on the eastern side of the Gran Sasso Massif. Castelli is best  known for its maiolicas, a form of decorative ceramic, which were collected by the nobility of Europe for centuries and which were at their pinnacle from the  16th through 18th century and are still produced today by local artists. Castelli maiolica was a favorite dinnerware of Russian Tsars. One of the most valued collections of Castelli ceramics is now housed at the Winter Palace of the Hermitage State Museum in St. Petersburg, Russia.

Castelli's main church is San Donato, which holds a maiolica altar-piece by Francesco Grue (1647) and a medieval silver cross of the Sulmona  school. Its tiled ceiling is believed to have been decorated by the ceramics master Oracio Pompei or artists working from his studio.

Today, Castelli hosts an art institute and ceramics museum as well as many ceramics shops and studios.

References

External links 

 Castelli pictures

Cities and towns in Abruzzo
Hilltowns in Abruzzo